In molecular biology, the Bcl-x interacting domain is a protein domain found in BAM, Bim and Bcl2-like protein 11. It is a long alpha helix, which is required for interaction with Bcl-x.

References

Protein domains